Hiorth is a Norwegian surname. Notable people with the surname include:

 Adam Hiorth (1816–1871), Norwegian merchant
 Adam Hiorth (barrister), Norwegian barrister
 Albert Hiorth, Norwegian engineer
 Åse Hiorth Lervik, Norwegian researcher
 Fredrik Hiorth, Norwegian engineer

Norwegian-language surnames